Antwerpen-Zuid is a railway station in the south of the city of Antwerp, Antwerp, Belgium. The old station opened on 10 July 1878 (goods) on the Lines 52 (1894) and 25A (1907). The old station building was demolished in 1965 and replaced with a stop in 1970 on the new through railway under the Scheldt river on the line 59. In 2006, the Butterfly Palace, designed by the Richard Rogers Partnership, was built on the location of the old station. It houses the Antwerp Courthouse.

Train services
The following services currently the serve the station:

Intercity services (IC-02) Ostend - Bruges - Gent - Sint-Niklaas - Antwerpen
Intercity services (IC-28) Gent - Sint-Niklaas - Antwerp (weekdays)
Local services (L-22) Puurs - Antwerp - Essen - Roosendaal (weekdays)
Local services (L-30) Lokeren - Antwerp

Tram services
Tram lines 4 and 10 serve the station, tram line 1 terminates at the nearby Zuid transport hub. All trams are operated by De Lijn.

Bus services
Bus services 13, 14, 180, 181, 182, 183, 290, 295, 298 and 500 serve the station, these are operated by De Lijn.

External links
Belgian Railways website
De Lijn website

Railway stations opened in 1878
Railway stations in Belgium
Railway stations in Antwerp
Public transport in Antwerp
Buildings and structures in Antwerp